Otar Arveladze (born 3 January 1992) is a Georgian footballer.

References

External links
 
 Profile at Pressball.by
 

1992 births
Living people
Footballers from Georgia (country)
FC Dnepr Mogilev players
Expatriate footballers in Belarus
Association football forwards